This page details the South African Army order of battle in 1940, before and after the formation of expeditionary forces.

South African Army – 3 September 1939 – July 1940 
Defence Headquarters: Pretoria, Transvaal

Cape Command 
HQ The Castle, Cape Town, Cape Province
 A. Permanent Force
 Cape Detachment, The Special Service Battalion: Cape Town
 No. 1 Anti-Aircraft Artillery Battery: Bamboevlei, Wynberg
 The Coast Artillery Brigade: HQ, The Castle, Cape Town
 2 Sections of Cape Garrison Artillery designated as Engineers and Signals: Cape Town
 1st Heavy Battery: Cape Town (Wynard Battery): Table Bay
 2nd Heavy Battery: Simonstown (Queen's Battery): Simonstown
 1st Medium Battery: Cape Town 
 2nd Medium Battery: Cape Town 
 No. 1 Armoured Train: Cape Town
 The Cape Field Artillery (Prince Albert's Own): Cape Town
 B. Active Citizen Force
 3rd Infantry Brigade: HQ Cape Town
 The Duke of Edinburgh's Own Rifles: Cape Town
 The Cape Town Highlanders (The Duke of Connaught and Strathearn's Own): Cape Town
 The Kimberley Regiment: Kimberley
 3rd Field Company, South African Engineer Corps: Cape Town
 8th Infantry Brigade: HQ Oudtshoorn
 Regiment Westelike Provinsie: Stellenbosch
 Regiment Suid-Westelike Distrikte: Oudtshoorn
 Die Middellandse Regiment: Graff-Reinet
 8th Field Company, South African Engineer Corps: Cape Town

Eastern Province Command 
HQ East London, Cape Province
 A. Permanent Force
 5th Heavy Battery, South African Permanent Garrison Artillery: East London
 6th Heavy Battery, South African Permanent Garrison Artillery: Port Elizabeth
 B. Active Citizen Force
 2nd Infantry Brigade: HQ Port Elizabeth
 The Prince Alfred's Guard: Port Elizabeth
 The Kaffrarian Rifles: East London
 The First City: Grahamstown
 2nd Field Company, South African Engineer Corps: Uitenhage
 Die Middellandse Regiment (See 8th Infantry Brigade)

Natal Command 
HQ Durban, Natal
 A. Permanent Force
 Royal Durban Light Infantry Company, The Special Service Battalion: Durban
 3rd Heavy Battery, South African Permanent Garrison Artillery: Durban Beach
 4th Heavy Battery, South African Permanent Garrison Artillery: The Bluff, Durban
 B. Active Citizen Force
 The Natal Field Artillery: Durban
 'A', 'B' Batteries: Durban
 'C' Battery: Pietermaritzburg
 1st Infantry Brigade (South Africa): HQ Pietermaritzburg
 1st Royal Natal Carabineers: Pietermaritzburg
 2nd Royal Natal Carabineers: Ladysmith
 The Umvoti Mounted Rifles: Greytown
 1st Field Company, South African Engineer Corps: Durban
 7th Infantry Brigade: HQ Durban
 The Natal Mounted Rifles: Durban
 1st, 2nd Royal Durban Light Infantry: Durban
 7th Field Company, South African Engineer Corps: Durban

Orange Free State Command 
HQ Bloemfontein, Orange Free State
 A. Permanent Force
 The Pioneer Battalion: Bloemfontein
 B. Active Citizen Force
 The Oranje Vry Staat Veldartillerie
 1ste Batterie: Tempe
 2de Batterie: Bethlehem
 4th Infantry Brigade: HQ Bloemfontein
 Regiment de Wet: Kroonstad
 Regiment Louw Wepner: Ladybrand
 Regiment President Steyn: Bloemfontein
 4th Field Company, South African Engineer Corps: Bloemfontein
 The Kimberley Regiment (See 3rd Infantry Brigade)

Robert's Heights and Transvaal Command 
HQ Robert's Heights, Transvaal
 A. Permanent Force
 The Special Service Battalion: Robert's Heights
 The Artillery School: Robert's Heights
 The Artillery Depot: Robert's Heights
 No. 2 Armoured Train, South African Permanent Garrison Artillery: Robert's Heights
 B. Active Citizen Force
 1st Field Survey Company, South African Engineer Corps: Robert's Heights
 6th Infantry Brigade (HQ Pretoria)
 1st, 2nd Pretoria Regiment (Princess Alice's Own): Pretoria
 Regiment De la Rey: Rustenburg
 6th Field Company, South African Engineer Corps: Pretoria

Witwatersrand Command 
HQ Johannesburg, Transvaal
 A. Active Citizen Force
 The Transvaal Horse Artillery (A, B Batteries): Johannesburg
 5th Infantry Brigade: HQ Johannesburg
 The Imperial Light Horse: Johannesburg
 1st, 2nd Transvaal Scottish: Johannesburg
 5th Field Company, South African Engineer Corps: Johannesburg
 9th Infantry Brigade: HQ Johannesburg
 The Witwatersrand Rifles: Johannesburg
 The Rand Light Infantry: Johannesburg
 Regiment Botha: Morgenson
 9th Field Company, South African Engineer Corps: Johannesburg

The Defence Rifle Associations (Commandos) 
 The Cape Defence Rifle Association
 The Transvaal Defence Rifle Association
 The Natal Defence Rifle Association
 The Orange Free State Defence Rifle Association

South African Army 1939–40

Active Citizen Force Infantry Battalions and Brigades 1940 
 March 1940 – Intended Organization (HQ & Recruiting Areas)
 1st South African Infantry Brigade
 1st Royal Natal Carabineers – Pietermaritzburg
 1st Duke of Edinburgh's Rifles – Cape Town
 1st Transvaal Scottish – Johannesburg
 2nd South African Infantry Brigade
 1st Field Force Battalion – Ladysmith
 2nd Field Force Battalion – Ladysmith
 1st Natal Mounted Rifles – Durban
 3rd South African Infantry Brigade
 1st Imperial Light Horse – Johannesburg
 1st Royal Durban Light Infantry – Durban
 1st Rand Light Infantry – Johannesburg
 4th South African Infantry Brigade
 2nd Royal Durban Light Infantry – Durban
 2nd Natal Mounted Rifles – Greytown
 The Kaffrarian Rifles – East London
 5th South African Infantry Brigade
 2nd Regiment Botha – North of Nylstroom
 3rd Transvaal Scottish – Benoni
 1st South African Irish – Johannesburg
 6th South African Infantry Brigade
 1st South African Police – Pretoria
 2nd South African Police – Pretoria
 2nd Transvaal Scottish – Johannesburg
 7th South African Infantry Brigade
 The Pretoria Highlanders – Pretoria
 1st Pretoria Regiment – Pretoria
 The First City – Grahamstown
 8th South African Infantry Brigade
 Regiment De la Rey
 1st Witwatersrand Rifles – Johannesburg
 The Cape Town Highlanders – Cape Town
 9th South African Infantry Brigade
 The Prince Alfred's Guard – Port Elizabeth
 Regiment President Steyn – Bloemfontein
 Regiment Westelike Provinsie – Stellenbosch
 10th South African Infantry Brigade
 The Kimberley Regiment- Kimberley
 Regiment South Westelike Distrike – George
 1st Regiment Botha – South of Nylstroom
 11th South African Infantry Brigade
 2nd Witwatersrand Rifles – Springs
 1st South-West African Infantry Battalion – Windhoek
 Die Middelandse Regiment – Graff-Reinet
 12th South African Infantry Brigade
 2nd Royal Natal Carabineers – Ladysmith
 2nd Pretoria Regiment – Pretoria
 2nd Rand Light Infantry – Krugersdorp
 Others
 Regiment de Wet – Kroonstaad
 Regiment Louw Wepner – Ladybrand
 2nd Natal Mounted Rifles – Greytown
 2nd Imperial Light Horse – Johannesburg

1st Reserve Brigade – Raised 29 February 1940 
 1st Battalion (Transvaal) – Raised 29 February 1940 at Johannesburg
 2nd Battalion (The Cape Peninsular Rifles) – Raised 29 February 1940 at Cape Town
 3rd Battalion (The Natal Scottish) – Raised 29 February 1940 at Durban
 4th Battalion (The Witwatersrand Rifles) – Raised 29 February 1940
 5th Battalion (Eastern Province) – Raised 29 February 1940
 6th Battalion (Transvaal) – Raised 29 February 1940
 7th Battalion (Orange Free State and Kimberly) – Raised 1941
 8th Battalion (Transvaal) – Raised 1941
 9th Battalion – Raised 1943
 10th Battalion – Raised 1943
 11th Battalion – Raised 1943
 12th Battalion – Raised 1943

1st Mounted Command Division 10 June 1940 – Piet Retief 
 1st Field Squadron, SAEC
 1st Mounted Brigade
 1st Mounted Regiment – Formed at Pretoria
 2nd Mounted Regiment – Formed in the Transvaal
 3rd Mounted Regiment – Formed in the Transvaal
 2nd Mounted Brigade
 4th Mounted Regiment – Formed in Orange Free State
 5th Mounted Regiment – Formed in Natal
 6th Mounted Regiment – Formed at the Castle, Cape Town, Cape Province

The Mobilization of the South African Mobile Field Force – 1940 

 1st South African Division – Raised 13 August 1940 at Robert's Heights
 3rd Field Brigade, SAA (Transvaal Horse Artillery)
 4th Field Brigade, SAA
 7th Field Brigade, SAA
 1st Anti-Tank Brigade, SAA
 1st, 5th, 12th Field Companies, SAEC
 19th Divisional Field Park Company, SAEC
 1st South African Infantry Brigade (Raised 13 May 1940 at Kafferskraal)
 1st Royal Natal Carabineers
 The Duke of Edinburgh's Own Rifles
 1st Transvaal Scottish
 2nd South African Infantry Brigade (Raised 13 May 1940 at Premier Mine)
 1st, 2nd Field Force Battalions
 1st Natal Mounted Rifles
 5th South African Infantry Brigade (Raised 16 June 1940 at Barberton)
 3rd Transvaal Scottish
 2nd Regiment Botha
 1st South African Irish Regiment Regiment
 2nd South African Division (Raised 23 October 1940)
 1st Field Brigade, SAA (Cape Field Artillery (Prince Alfred's Own))
 2nd Field Brigade, SAA (Natal Field Artillery)
 5th Light Field Brigade, SAA
 2nd Anti-Tank Brigade, SAA
 2nd, 4th, 10th Field Companies, SAEC
 20th Divisional Field Park Company, SAEC
 3rd South African Infantry Brigade (Raised 8 June 1940 at Zonderwater)
 1st Imperial Light Horse
 1st Royal Durban Light Infantry
 1st Rand Light Infantry
 4th South African Infantry Brigade (Raised 17 June 1940 at Oribi Camp, Pietermaritzburg
 2nd Natal Mounted Rifles (Until October 1940)
 2nd Royal Durban Light Infantry
 The Kaffrarian Rifles
 The Umvoti Mounted Rifles (From October 1940)
 6th South African Infantry Brigade (Raised 17 June 1940 at Pietermaritzburg
 1st Pretoria Highlanders (Until November 1940)
 1st, 2nd South African Police
 2nd Transvaal Scottish (From 21 November 1940)
 3rd South African Division (Raised 23 October 1940 at Pretoria)
 6th Light Field Brigade, SAA
 8th, 9th, 10th Field Companies, SAEC
 17th Divisional Field Park Company, SAEC
 7th South African Infantry Brigade (Raised 11 July 1940 at Premier Mine)
 1st Pretoria Regiment
 1st Witwatersrand Rifles
 Regiment De la Rey
 8th South African Infantry Brigade (Raised 1 July 1940 in East London. Disbanded November 1940.)
 The Cape Town Highlanders
 The First City
 Prince Alfred's Guard
 9th South African Infantry Brigade (Raised 15 July 1940 at Premier Mine)
 Regiment President Steyn (Until 22/11/40)
 Die Middelandse Regiment
 Regiment Westelike Provinsie (Until 1 September 1940)
 2nd Pretoria Regiment (From Sep 1940 to Oct 1940)
 2nd Transvaal Scottish (From 4 Sep 1940 to 21 Nov 1940)
 2nd Royal Natal Carabineers (From 9 Sep 1940 to 3 Oct 1940)
 1st Regiment Botha (From Sep 1940 to Nov 1940)
 1st Pretoria Highlanders (From Nov 1940)
 The Cape Town Highlanders (From 6 Nov 1940)
 2nd Natal Mounted Rifles (From 23 Nov 1940)
 10th South African Infantry Brigade (Raised July 1940.)
 The Kimberley Regiment
 2nd Witwatersrand Rifles
 The First City Regiment
 11th South African Infantry Brigade (Raised July 1940. Disbanded October 1940.)
 2nd Witwatersrand Rifles
 1st South-West African Infantry Battalion
 2nd Imperial Light Horse
 12th South African Infantry Brigade (Raised July 1940. Disbanded September 1940.)
 2nd Royal Natal Carabineers
 2nd Pretoria Regiment
 2nd Rand Light Infantry

See also 
 List of British Empire divisions in the Second World War
 List of Helmet and Shoulder Flashes and Hackles of South African Military Units

Notes

References 

South African Army
World War II orders of battle
Military units and formations of the British Empire in World War II